Patrick Baynes (born October 11, 1984) is an American entrepreneur.

He is best known for his early work at LinkedIn, for being a co-founder of PeopleLinx, and for being a founder of UpdatesCentral.

Biography
Born in Wausau, Wisconsin, his father became a colonel in the US Army, resulting in the family moving around the United States, including to Chicago and later Atlanta, Georgia. After graduating from Alfred University with a BSBA in Marketing, he studied at Bond University on Australia's Gold Coast.

Baynes is a speaker on Internet business strategy, go-to-market strategy and strategic consulting, as well as personal strategies for individuals to raise their profile and develop business using social networking.

Early career
Upon returning home to the United States while working for a country club, Baynes watched Google News for a suitable Internet start-up to join. Noticing that LinkedIn was opening offices close to the former PayPal operations in Omaha, Nebraska, close to one of his extended family bases, in 2007 Baynes became company employee No. 162. At LinkedIn, Baynes became responsible for envisaging and delivering the company's customer operations and internal training, supporting the network's now more than 250 million members.

Business Ventures

PeopleLinx
While working at LinkedIn together, Baynes and Nathan Egan pitched to LinkedIn's board the idea of offering professional services. After the proposal was turned down, Baynes and Egan co-founded Philadelphia-based PeopleLinx in 2009. With the aim to help large corporate organizations and their employees get the most out of social networks, during the first two years of operations the company offered LinkedIn-focused consulting and training programs, but the primarily Fortune 500 corporate customers wanted something with scale that would offer continued engagement beyond the training, together with associated metrics of success. The result was the SaaS-based PeopleLinx, the world's first engagement, social selling, and analytics software for social media.

As Head of Partnerships, Baynes was responsible for all client-facing services, partnerships and social sales strategy. Having founded and developed the company through financial bootstrapping, in May 2012 state-funded economic-development organization the Ben Franklin Technology Partners of Southeastern Pennsylvania approved a $150,000 investment in the firm. In March 2013, PeopleLinx raised $3.2 million in a series A funding round from both angel investors and investment firms, including: Bala Cynwyd-based Osage Venture Partners; New York-based Greycroft Partners; and Center City-based Mission Operators Group.

Game Time Updates
In 2015, he left PeopleLinx to work on a new startup called Game Time Updates, founded with help from Michael Coupe and Will Dyson, developer. Game Time Updates aimed to be a social media automated marketing software and tool for the restaurant, bar, and beverage industry. The service boasted the ability to monetize social following, keep social media updated with consistently high quality content, reporting, and an opportunity to pair brands with college and professional sports teams.

UpdatesCentral
UpdatesCentral, a customer engagement and lead generator for social media, was founded by Patrick Baynes in June 2009. Baynes is CEO of UpdatesCentral and leads vision, execution, and customer relationships. The idea occurred to him by observing a busy local eatery's social accounts as they were rarely updated despite massive opportunities, and the unsuitable current options for doing so. In 2011, Will Dyson joined as CTO and in 2014, Michael Coupe joined as co-founder and COO. Launched in January 2015, UpdatesCentral now boasts 500 small business clients and publishes 2,000 to 3,000 social media posts a day.

Awards
May 2003: Jonathan Allen Award for Leadership, Alfred University (scholarship)
March 2014: 40 Under 40, Philadelphia Business Journal
April 2014: Cool Vendors in Content and Social Analytics, Gartner
October 2016: Marcum Innovator of the Year finalist, Marcum

References

External links
PeopleLinx

1984 births
Living people
People from Wausau, Wisconsin
Alfred University alumni
Bond University alumni
American computer businesspeople
American technology company founders
American technology chief executives
American technology writers
Businesspeople from Philadelphia